This page shows results of Canadian federal elections in the central, earlier-development areas of Toronto–in particular, Old Toronto (what was the city of Toronto prior to the 1998 amalgamation), the former Borough of York, most of the former City of East York, and the southern, older portions of the former City of North York, in particular those south of Highway 401 and west of Leslie Street.

Regional profile
Until 1962, most ridings in inner Toronto were Progressive Conservative strongholds, aside from splits with the Liberals in the 1949 and 1953 elections. Since 1962, Central Toronto, particularly Old Toronto, has generally leaned to the political left or centre-left. Most elections in the 1960s resulted in a small handful (most often two or three) of New Democratic Party (NDP) seats with the Liberals taking all or most of the rest. Between 1972 and 1988, inclusive, the Tories usually split Toronto seats almost evenly with the Liberals (1972, 1979, 1984) or were reduced to about the same number of seats as the NDP (1974, 1980, 1988) with the Grits taking the lion's share. In 1993, 1997, and 2000, the Grits held every seat in the former Metro Toronto, in some cases with large margins. The NDP broke through to win a seat in the 2004 election, when its new leader Jack Layton took Toronto—Danforth, and did slightly better in each of the next two elections, held in 2006 and 2008.

In 2011, the Liberal vote collapsed under the onslaught of both the Conservatives and the NDP, with the Conservatives taking two uptown ridings, the Liberals retaining two downtown ridings along Yonge Street, and the NDP winning the remaining six. Before then, centre-right parties had been completely shut out in central Toronto since the PCs lost all their seats in 1993. The region reverted to its post-1990 form in 2015, as a massive surge in Liberal support allowed the Liberals to sweep Toronto.

Votes by party throughout time

2019 - 43rd General Election 

|-
| style="background-color:whitesmoke" |Beaches—East York
||
|Nathaniel Erskine-Smith32,64757.20%
|
|Nadirah Nazeer8,02614.06%
|
|Mae J. Nam12,19621.37%
|
|Sean Manners3,3785.92%
|
|Deborah McKenzie8311.46%
|
|
||
|Nathaniel Erskine-Smith
|-
| style="background-color:whitesmoke" |Davenport
||
|Julie Dzerowicz23,25143.72%
|
|Sanjay Bhatia4,9219.25%
|
|Andrew Cash21,81241.02%
|
|Hannah Conover-Arthurs2,3974.51%
|
|Francesco Ciardullo4960.93%
|
|Chai Kalevar (Ind.)790.15%Elizabeth Rowley (Comm.)1380.26%Troy Young (Ind.)860.16%
||
|Julie Dzerowicz
|-
| style="background-color:whitesmoke" |Don Valley West
||
|Rob Oliphant29,14855.80%
|
|Yvonne Robertson16,30431.21%
|
|Laurel MacDowell3,8047.28%
|
|Amanda Kistindey2,2574.32%
|
|Ian Prittie4440.85%
|
|John Kittredge (Libert.)2770.53%
||
|Rob Oliphant
|-
| style="background-color:whitesmoke" |Eglinton—Lawrence
||
|Marco Mendicino29,85053.30%
|
|Chani Aryeh-Bain18,54933.12%
|
|Alexandra Nash4,7418.47%
|
|Reuben DeBoer2,2784.07%
|
|Michael Staffieri5861.05%
|
|
||
|Marco Mendicino
|-
| style="background-color:whitesmoke" |Parkdale—High Park
||
|Arif Virani28,85247.39%
|
|Adam Pham8,01513.16%
|
|Paul M. Taylor19,18031.50%
|
|Nick Capra3,9166.43%
|
|Greg Wycliffe6431.06%
|
|Lorne Gershuny (M-L)430.07%Alykhan Pabani (Comm.)1190.20%Terry Parker (Mar.)1190.20%
||
|Arif Virani
|-
| style="background-color:whitesmoke" |Spadina—Fort York
||
|Adam Vaughan33,82255.77%
|
|Frank Fang10,68017.61%
|
|Diana Yoon12,18820.10%
|
|Dean Maher3,1745.23%
|
|Robert Stewart6721.11%
|
|Marcela Ramirez (Ind.)1140.19%
||
|Adam Vaughan
|-
| style="background-color:whitesmoke" |Toronto Centre
||
|Bill Morneau31,27157.37%
|
|Ryan Lester6,61312.13%
|
|Brian Chang12,14222.27%
|
|Annamie Paul3,8527.07%
|
|
|
|Sean Carson (Rhino.)1470.27%Bronwyn Cragg (Comm.)1250.23%Philip Fernandez (M-L)540.10%Rob Lewin (Animal)1820.33%Jason Tavares (Ind.)1260.23%
||
|Bill Morneau
|-
| style="background-color:whitesmoke" |Toronto—Danforth
||
|Julie Dabrusin27,68147.68%
|
|Zia Choudhary6,09110.49%
|
|Min Sook Lee19,28333.21%
|
|Chris Tolley3,7616.48%
|
|Tara Dos Remedios6211.07%
|
|Elizabeth Abbott (Animal)2610.45%Ivan Byard (Comm.)1510.26%John Kladitis (Ind.)2100.36%
||
|Julie Dabrusin
|-
| style="background-color:whitesmoke" |Toronto—St. Paul's
||
|Carolyn Bennett32,49454.31%
|
|Jae Truesdell12,93321.61%
|
|Alok Mukherjee9,44215.78%
|
|Sarah Climenhaga4,0426.76%
|
|John Kellen9231.54%
|
|
||
|Carolyn Bennett
|-
| style="background-color:whitesmoke" |University—Rosedale
||
|Chrystia Freeland29,65251.67%
|
|Helen-Claire Tingling9,34216.28%
|
|Melissa Jean-Baptiste Vajda12,57321.91%
|
|Tim Grant4,8618.47%
|
|Aran Lockwood5100.89%
|
|Karin Brothers (SCC)1240.22%Drew Garvie (Comm.)1430.25%Steve Rutschinski (M-L)270.05%Liz White (Animal)1590.28%
||
|Chrystia Freeland
|-
| style="background-color:whitesmoke" |York South—Weston
||
|Ahmed Hussen25,97658.42%
|
|Jasveen Rattan8,41518.93%
|
|Yafet Tewelde7,75417.44%
|
|Nicki Ward1,6333.67%
|
|Gerard Racine6851.54%
|
|
||
|Ahmed Hussen
|}

2015 - 42nd General Election

2011 - 41st General Election

2008 - 40th General Election

2006 - 39th General Election

2004 - 38th General Election

Maps 

Beaches-East York
Davenport
Don Valley West
Eglinton-Lawrence
Parkdale-High Park
St. Paul's
Toronto Centre
Toronto-Danforth
Trinity-Spadina
York South-Weston

Notes

References

Politics of Toronto
Toronto, Central